Markovsky is a rural locality (a settlement) in Verkhnerechenskoye Rural Settlement, Nekhayevsky District, Volgograd Oblast, Russia. The population was 13 as of 2010.

Geography 
Markovsky is located on the bank of the Tishanka River, 14 km west of Nekhayevskaya (the district's administrative centre) by road. Avraamovsky is the nearest rural locality.

References 

Rural localities in Nekhayevsky District